Prickwillow railway station was located  on the line between  and  in Cambridgeshire, England. It served the village of Prickwillow, and closed in 1850.

References

Former Great Eastern Railway stations
Railway stations in Great Britain opened in 1845
Railway stations in Great Britain closed in 1850
Disused railway stations in Cambridgeshire